Scott Alexander Stewart (born 29 April 1996) is a Scottish footballer who plays for Arbroath as a full-back or midfielder. He began his career at Airdrieonians.

Career

Airdrieonians
Stewart was born in Edinburgh but raised in Rutherglen, South Lanarkshire where he attended Stonelaw High School. His father Sandy was a footballer who spent the majority of his career with the original Airdrieonians club and also served as player and manager at its successor Airdrie United, where Scott began his career in the youth setup.

At the age of 17, Stewart received his first call-up to the senior squad at the club (now re-named Airdrieonians) in August 2013, making his senior debut two months later in a 2–0 home defeat to Forfar Athletic in Scottish League One, with his first start in the competition against Stranraer in March 2014. He initially began his career as a midfielder but retrained as a full-back, which he stated drew more scrutiny on his performances from his father, who had played the same position. After three seasons as a squad member, he became a regular starter for the Diamonds in the 2016–17 campaign, going on to make over 100 appearances over the next three years, including a promotion playoff semi-final defeat to Alloa Athletic on penalties in 2017 (the closest Airdrie came to either being promoted or relegated in his time with the club) and a Scottish Cup visit to holders Celtic in 2019.

He was voted the Airdrieonians 'Young Player of the Year' for 2016–17 and the overall 'Player of the Year' for 2017–18, having been named team captain in the latter part of that season and agreed a new contract to stay at the club.

Arbroath
In June 2019, Stewart transferred to Arbroath, newly-promoted to the Scottish Championship. He made his debut for the club on 23 July 2019, in a 3–0 defeat away to Hibernian in the group stage of the 2019–20 Scottish League Cup. He was an important member of the Red Lichties team in their bid for promotion to the Scottish Premiership in the 2021–22 season, while also working as a P.E. teacher at Rutherglen's Trinity High School.

References

Living people
1996 births
Scottish footballers
Association football fullbacks
Association football midfielders
Footballers from Edinburgh
Sportspeople from Rutherglen
People educated at Stonelaw High School
Scottish Professional Football League players
Airdrieonians F.C. players
Arbroath F.C. players
Footballers from South Lanarkshire
Scottish schoolteachers